Coconuts Comedy Club is a chain of comedy clubs. They first opened in St. Pete Beach, FL in May 1986. Since then many more locations have opened up in Florida and  throughout the rest of the country. They also have clubs in parts of the Caribbean and Europe.

Locations
St. Petersburg, Florida
Cape Coral, Florida
Clearwater, Florida
Clearwater Beach, Florida
Safety Harbor, Florida
New Port Richey, Florida
Tampa, Florida
Brandon, Florida
Lakeland, Florida
Gainesville, Florida
Boca Raton, Florida
Pensacola, Florida
Fort Myers, Florida

Outside Florida:
Nashville, Tennessee
Newport, Rhode Island
Niantic, East Lyme, Connecticut
Hilton Head, South Carolina
Myrtle Beach, South Carolina
Chicago, Illinois
Seven Mile Beach, Grand Cayman

External links
 Official website

Comedy clubs in the United States